Para Assembly constituency is an assembly constituency in Purulia district in the Indian state of West Bengal. It is reserved for scheduled castes.

Overview
As per orders of the Delimitation Commission, No. 245 Para Assembly constituency (SC) is composed of the following: Para and Raghunathpur II community development blocks.

Para Assembly constituency is part of No. 35 Purulia (Lok Sabha constituency). It was earlier part of Bankura (Lok Sabha constituency).

Members of Legislative Assembly

Election results

2021

2016

2011

.# Swing calculated on Congress+Trinamool Congress vote percentages taken together in 2006. Intervening by-election ignored for comparisons.

1977-2009
Subsequent to the resignation of the sitting MLA, Bilasibala Sahis, after her election to the Zilla Parishad (district council), Minu Bauri of CPI(M) won the Para seat in the 2009 by-elections defeating Charan Bauri of JMM.

In 2006, 2001, 1996 and 1991 Bilasibala Sahis of CPI(M) won the Para assembly seat defeating her nearest rivals Sima Bauri of Trinamool Congress, Mira Bauri of Trinamool Congress, Gobordhan Bagdi of JMM and Durgadas Bauri of Congress respectively. Contests in most years were multi cornered but only winners and runners are being mentioned. Gobinda Bauri of CPI(M) defeated Kashinath Bauri of Congress in 1987, and Sarat Das of Congress in 1982 and 1977.

1962-1972
Sarat Das of Congress won in 1972 and 1971. Tinkori Bouri of Bangla Congress won in 1969. S. Bauri of Bangla Congress won in 1967. Nepal Bauri of Congress won in 1962.

References

Assembly constituencies of West Bengal
Politics of Purulia district